Ornipholidotos evoei is a butterfly in the family Lycaenidae. It is found in Cameroon, Equatorial Guinea and Gabon. The habitat consists of forests.

References

Butterflies described in 2005
Taxa named by Michel Libert
Ornipholidotos